Line 10 (Italian: Linea dieci) of Metropolitana di Napoli is a proposed rapid transit line in the Italian city of Naples, also reaching the adjacent city of Afragola.

History
In July 2003, the City of Naples adopted a plan for a line (Metro of Casoria) that would have connected the city centre (Piazza Cavour, connecting with Lines 1 and 2) to Naples International Airport at Capodichino (connecting with line 1), the neighboring municipality of  Casoria and the then-planned Napoli Afragola railway station in the municipality of Afragola.

In July 2020, plans for the line were reactivated, with construction on this line possibly beginning as soon as 2021, and is expected to generate 150,000 daily passengers, or 43 million annually.

Stations
 Cavour
 Foria-Orto Botanico
 Carlo III
 Ottocalli
 Leonardo Bianchi
 Di Vittorio
 Casavatore-San Pietro
 Casoria-Casavatore
 Casoria Centro
 Casoria-Afragola
 Afragola Garibaldi
 Afragola Centro 
 Afragola Stazione Alta Velocità

See also
 Metropolitana di Napoli
 List of Naples metro stations
 List of rapid transit systems

References

External links
 Official site of the Metropolitana di Naples 
 Urbanrail.net Naples rail website
 Railways and metro station of Naples 

Naples Metro lines
Proposed railway lines in Italy